China is scheduled to compete at the 2017 World Aquatics Championships in Budapest, Hungary from 14 July to 30 July.

Medalists

 Legend: (R) = Reserve Athlete

Diving

China has entered 16 divers (ten male and six female).

Men

Women

Mixed

Open water swimming

China has entered eight open water swimmers

Swimming

Chinese swimmers have achieved qualifying standards in the following events (up to a maximum of 2 swimmers in each event at the A-standard entry time, and 1 at the B-standard):

Men

Women

Mixed

Synchronized swimming

China's synchronized swimming team consisted of 14 athletes (1 male and 13 female).

Women

Mixed

 Legend: (R) = Reserve Athlete

Water polo

China qualified a women's team.

Women's tournament

Team roster

Peng Lin
Bi Yanan
Mei Xiaohan
Xiong Dunhan
Niu Guannan
Guo Ning
Nong Sanfeng
Zhang Cong
Zhao Zihan (C)
Zhang Danyi
Chen Xiao
Zhang Jing
Shen Yineng

Group play

Playoffs

9th–12th place semifinals

Ninth place game

References

Nations at the 2017 World Aquatics Championships
China at the World Aquatics Championships
2017 in Chinese sport